In retail terms, a go-back is an item of merchandise which must be placed back on the store shelves. Such items usually accumulate during the store's open hours, and comprise a combination of returned items, items customers have decided not to purchase, and items store employees may have found left lying on the wrong shelf.  Go-backs can often accumulate over several days because businesses, especially larger department stores, tend to have other priorities at the time and not enough employment to put the go-backs away. Go-backs are sometimes referred to as re-shop, put-backs, misplaced, shop-backs, returns, abandons, left-behinds, loose-stock, back-stock or shop-downs.

See also
Stock-taking

Retail merchandise types by status